The Piankatank River is a  river in the U.S. state of Virginia.  Located on the Middle Peninsula, between the Rappahannock and York rivers, it was the site of numerous actions during the American Civil War.

The Piankatank is primarily a tidal river of the Chesapeake Bay. The head of the river meets with the mouth of Dragon Swamp. Bordered by Mathews and Gloucester counties to the south and Middlesex County to the north, the Piankatank is crossed only by Virginia State Route 3 approximately  upriver of its mouth.

See also 
 List of Virginia rivers

References

Rivers of Virginia
Rivers of Mathews County, Virginia
Rivers of Gloucester County, Virginia
Bodies of water of Middlesex County, Virginia
Tributaries of the Chesapeake Bay